This article provides a list of scientific, nationwide public opinion polls that were conducted relating to the 2008 United States presidential election.

Presidential election

Two-way contest: Barack Obama vs John McCain

Three-way contest

Four-way contest

Five-way contest

Earlier polls

Two-way contest
Related article:  Graphical Representations of Two-Way Contest Data

Democratic nominee vs. Republican nominee

Three-way race

Four-way race

Democratic field vs. Republican field

Three-way contest
See

Support likelihood

Democratic candidate

Republican candidate

Other polls

Candidate distinctions
Would you be willing to vote for a female presidential candidate in 2008?

Would you be willing to vote for an African American presidential candidate in 2008?

Would you be willing to vote for a Mormon (a member of the Church of Jesus Christ of Latter-day Saints) presidential candidate in 2008?

Would you be willing to vote for a Roman Catholic presidential candidate in 2008?

Would you be willing to vote for a Jewish presidential candidate in 2008?

Would you be willing to vote for a Hispanic presidential candidate in 2008?

Would you be willing to vote for a thrice-married candidate in 2008?

Would you be willing to vote for a seventy-two year old candidate in 2008?

Would you be willing to vote for a homosexual candidate in 2008?

Would you be willing to vote for an atheist candidate in 2008?

Candidate quality

If elected, would the following candidate make a good president or a bad president?

Candidate ideology
Do you think the following candidate is too liberal, too conservative, or about right?

See also
Statewide opinion polling for the United States presidential election, 2008
Nationwide opinion polling for the Democratic Party 2008 presidential candidates
Statewide opinion polling for the Democratic Party presidential primaries, 2008
Nationwide opinion polling for the Republican Party 2008 presidential candidates
Statewide opinion polling for the Republican Party presidential primaries, 2008
Historical polling for U.S. Presidential elections

External links
U.S. Election Polltracker National opinion polls presented graphically, BBC News
AmericanResearchGroup.com state polls
ireachable.com 2008 US elections online opinion poll
Select2008 issue based polling, candidate face-offs, and live results
StrategicVision.biz state polls
Aggregated
FiveThirtyEight.com weighted aggregate Electoral College polls
Electoral-vote.com maps of Electoral College and Senate polls by state
PollingReport.com polling questions and results
Pollster.com polls and charts

References

Nationwide